In computer science, serializing tokens are a concept in concurrency control arising from the ongoing development of DragonFly BSD.  According to Matthew Dillon, they are most akin to SPLs, except a token works across multiple CPUs while SPLs only work within a single CPU's domain.

Serializing tokens allow programmers to write multiprocessor-safe code without themselves or the lower level subsystems needing to be aware of every single entity that may also be holding the same token.

Comparison with mutual exclusion (mutex) 

Tokens and mutual exclusion (mutex) mechanisms are locks. Unlike mutexes, tokens do not exclude other threads from accessing the resource while they are blocked or asleep. A thread sharing resources with other threads can be stopped and started for a variety of reasons:
 Timeslicing: the user space (US) scheduler tries to ensure that all threads get a fair chance to run, so it runs each thread for a brief period of time (a timeslice) and then switches to another thread.
 Concurrent execution: in multiprocessor computers, a thread may be run at exactly the same time as another thread on a different CPU.
 Preemption: a thread may preempt a lower-priority thread, such as a hardware interrupt or Light Weight Kernel Threads.
 Voluntary blocking: a thread may sleep if it has to wait for something, has no work to do, or calls a function that blocks. Even the call to acquire a lock can block.

The following table summarizes the properties of tokens and mutexes.

Issues such as deadlock and priority inversion can be very difficult to avoid, and require coordination at many levels of the kernel. Because locking with tokens does not deadlock and acquired tokens need not be atomic when later operations block, it allow much simpler code than mutexes.

Example  
The following pseudocode and explanations illustrate how serializing tokens work.

Prior art in the Darwin kernel 
Mac OS X's Darwin kernel uses a similar technique (called a funnel) to serialize access to the BSD portion of the kernel.

See also 
 Lock-free and wait-free algorithms

References  
 A mailing list thread where Matthew Dillon explains tokens in great detail
 Darwin Threading Architectures

Concurrency control